The Sun Belt Conference (SBC) is a collegiate athletic conference that has been affiliated with the NCAA's Division I since 1976. Originally a non-football conference, the Sun Belt began sponsoring football in 2001. Its football teams participate in the Division I Football Bowl Subdivision (FBS). The 14 member institutions of the Sun Belt are distributed across the Southern United States.

History

The Sun Belt Conference was founded on August 4, 1976, with the University of New Orleans, the University of South Alabama, Georgia State University, Jacksonville University, the University of North Carolina at Charlotte, and the University of South Florida. Over the next ten years the conference would add Western Kentucky University, Old Dominion University, the University of Alabama at Birmingham, and Virginia Commonwealth University. New Orleans was forced out of the league in 1980 due to its small on-campus gymnasium that the conference did not deem suitable for conference competition. New Orleans competed as an independent before joining the newly formed American South Conference in 1987.

After the 1990–91 basketball season, all members of the Sun Belt, except Western Kentucky, South Alabama, and Jacksonville, departed for other conferences. The Sun Belt, including incoming member in the University of Arkansas at Little Rock, then merged with the American South Conference, made up of Arkansas State University, Louisiana Tech University, the University of Southwestern Louisiana (now the University of Louisiana at Lafayette), the University of Texas–Pan American (now merged into the University of Texas Rio Grande Valley), New Orleans (re-joined), Lamar University, and the University of Central Florida. Although the American South was the larger conference, the merged league retained the Sun Belt name. In 1991, the league first began to explore the idea of sponsoring football.

Central Florida left the league following the 1991–92 academic year due to a dispute over television rights, among other reasons. Lamar, Texas–Pan American, and Jacksonville departed at the end of the 1997–98 academic year. Florida International University joined the Sun Belt in 1998, and the University of Denver was added in 1999. Louisiana Tech departed after the 2000–01 academic year.

The conference did not sponsor football until 2001, when the league added former Big West Conference members New Mexico State University and the University of North Texas and former Ohio Valley Conference member (an FBS Independent on football) Middle Tennessee State University as full members (all three of them joined a year earlier for all sports in the 2000-01 school year) and added FBS Independent University of Louisiana at Monroe and Big West member University of Idaho as football-only members. These new members gave the Sun Belt seven football playing members in their first season, as Arkansas State and Louisiana were already full members which sponsored football. Another Big West school, Utah State University, was added as a football-only member in 2003, then departed in 2005 with Idaho and New Mexico State for the Western Athletic Conference (WAC).

In 2004, Troy University became a football-only member before joining for all sports in the 2005–06 academic year. In 2005, Florida Atlantic became a football-only member before joining for all sports in the 2006-07 academic year. In 2006, Louisiana–Monroe joined the conference as an all-sports full member when the Warhawks left their former home, the Southland Conference.

Longtime Sun Belt member Western Kentucky joined the Sun Belt's football conference in 2009 after its Board of Regents voted to upgrade the school's football program to Division I FBS.

On November 11, 2009, New Orleans announced it was investigating a move from Division I to the NCAA's Division III. In order to maintain athletic scholarships, UNO instead opted for entry into Division II. On April 20, 2011, UNO officially received transition approval from the NCAA Division II Membership Committee. (UNO later decided to remain in Division I, and joined the Southland Conference in 2013.)

Early 2010s realignment

On April 9, 2012, Georgia State, one of the founding members of the Sun Belt Conference, announced that it would be returning to the conference as a full member in 2013. As part of the move, the football program began a transition from FCS to FBS in the 2012 season; it played a full Sun Belt schedule as a "transitional" FBS member in 2013, and became a full FBS member, with bowl eligibility, in 2014. On May 2, 2012, Texas State University announced it would leave the WAC after just one year and join the Sun Belt in July 2013 to begin play for the 2013–14 academic year. At the press conference to announce Texas State's addition, Sun Belt Commissioner Karl Benson also hinted that more changes could be on the way for the conference. On May 25, 2012, the conference announced that the University of Texas at Arlington (a non-football member) had accepted an invitation to join the conference and would become a full member by 2013.

On May 4, 2012, FIU and North Texas announced that they would be leaving the Sun Belt for Conference USA on July 1, 2013 as part of a Conference USA expansion effort involving four other schools. On November 29, 2012, Florida Atlantic and Middle Tennessee State announced that they would also leave the Sun Belt for Conference USA. The move for Florida Atlantic and MTSU was originally scheduled to take place in 2014; however, the two schools announced on January 28, 2013 that they would leave for Conference USA a year early, departing on July 1, 2013 with FIU and North Texas. Western Kentucky also accepted an invitation to join Conference USA on April 1, 2013, and departed from the Sun Belt on July 1, 2014.

These moves depleted the Sun Belt and made the need to expand their membership more urgent than ever, as the Sun Belt was left with ten full members and only eight members that sponsor football (the minimum number required for a conference to sponsor football at the FBS level) for the 2013 season. Appalachian State University accepted an invitation on March 27, 2013 to join the Sun Belt effective July 1, 2014. Georgia Southern University accepted a similar Sun Belt invitation at the same time as Appalachian State. Appalachian State and Georgia Southern both joined for all sports from the Southern Conference on July 1, 2014. Both schools had been very successful within the Football Championship Subdivision, combining to win nine national championships since 1985. They upgraded to the Football Bowl Subdivision, and were eligible for Sun Belt conference championships in 2014, but were not postseason-eligible in football until 2015.

The Sun Belt also granted football-only invites to Idaho and New Mexico State on March 28, 2013. Idaho and New Mexico State were both former Sun Belt members (Idaho for football only, New Mexico State for all sports) from 2001 to 2005. The large number of defections from the WAC forced that conference to drop football after the 2012 season. Idaho and New Mexico State were the only remaining WAC members that sponsored football, and competed as FBS independents for the 2013 season before competing in the Sun Belt in 2014. Idaho is located by far the farthest away from the other Sun Belt conference members, but it was rejected by the Mountain West Conference, leaving it with no other choice.

On September 1, 2015, Coastal Carolina University accepted an invitation to join the Sun Belt Conference. The university joined in all sports except for football starting July 1, 2016, with football joining in 2017.

The conference announced on March 1, 2016, that the affiliation agreement with Idaho and New Mexico State would not be extended past the 2017 season.

The conference announced that beginning in 2018, the conference (10 teams) would be divided into two divisions for football: East: Appalachian State, Coastal Carolina, Georgia Southern, Georgia State, and Troy; West: Arkansas State, Louisiana, Louisiana–Monroe, South Alabama, and Texas State. The winner of each division will meet in the Sun Belt Championship game.

Early 2020s realignment 

Following the July 30, 2021 announcement of the University of Texas at Austin and the University of Oklahoma both moving from the Big 12 Conference to the Southeastern Conference, the world of college athletics faced the prospect of realignment once again. The Big 12 responded on September 10 by adding three schools from the American Athletic Conference (The American) and BYU, an FBS independent and otherwise a member of the non-football West Coast Conference, effective in 2023. The American in turn responded on October 21 by adding six schools from Conference USA (C-USA), with 2023 as the most likely entry date. Following this move, rumors began to circulate that the Sun Belt was planning to take on another three members (the University of Southern Mississippi (Southern Miss or USM), Marshall University, and former Sun Belt member Old Dominion University) from C-USA, likely in response to that conference's remaining teams worried of the conference folding. These moves would help to establish the market areas for the Sun Belt and The American, which cover similar geographic footprints. The American would now have most of its members in metropolitan areas, while the Sun Belt would instead have its members in smaller college towns.

On October 22, The Action Network reported that Southern Miss had been accepted as a new Sun Belt member, with 2023 as the likely entry date. The report also stated that the Sun Belt would add three more members—the aforementioned Marshall and Old Dominion, plus James Madison University, a member of the FCS Colonial Athletic Association (CAA). Southern Miss and Old Dominion were respectively announced as incoming members on October 26 and 27. At the time, both were to join no later than 2023. On October 29, the day after Marshall named its next president, both the Sun Belt and Marshall issued tweets announcing that school's entry; a formal announcement followed the next day and an introductory press conference was held on November 1. As for James Madison, its board met on October 29 to discuss a potential Sun Belt invitation, but its timeline was also affected by a Virginia state law that requires legislative approval for a four-year public school to move upward in athletic classification, including FCS to FBS. The legislative committee that must review the move did not meet until November 5, after the state's gubernatorial election. The committee unanimously approved JMU's move from FCS to FBS, and the Sun Belt move was officially announced on November 6. The original Action Network report also stated that the two full non-football SBC members, Little Rock and UT Arlington, would no longer be members of the conference after the 2022–23 school year.

Initial plans were for James Madison to compete as a de facto Sun Belt affiliate in sports other than football and men's soccer during the 2022–23 season. However, those plans would eventually change, with JMU and the SBC jointly announcing on February 2, 2022 that JMU would become a full SBC member, including football, in 2022–23.

By the end of January 2022, both non-football members would announce their departures for other conferences, effective that July. On December 8, 2021, the University of Arkansas Board of Trustees voted to accept an invitation for Little Rock to join the Ohio Valley Conference, and UT Arlington, which had been a Western Athletic Conference member in the 2012–13 school year, announced its return to that conference on January 21, 2022.

Shortly thereafter, Marshall, Old Dominion, and Southern Miss announced that they planned to leave C-USA for the Sun Belt in July 2022. They claimed to have notified C-USA of their plans in December 2021, apparently seeking to negotiate a 2022 exit. C-USA had indicated in late January 2022 that it expected the three schools to remain in that league through the 2022–23 school year. Marshall escalated the situation by filing suit against C-USA in its local court in an attempt to force a 2022 move. On March 29, Conference USA agreed to let Marshall, Old Dominion, and Southern Miss move to the Sun Belt starting July 1, 2022.

On April 6, with the entrance of three new men's soccer-sponsoring schools in James Madison, Marshall, and Old Dominion, the Sun Belt announced that men's soccer would be reinstated as a sponsored sport. The three aforementioned programs joined current Sun Belt members Coastal Carolina (previously affiliates with Conference USA) as well as Georgia State and Georgia Southern (previously affiliates with the Mid-American Conference). Additionally, it was announced that Kentucky, South Carolina, and West Virginia would join as men's soccer affiliate members beginning in fall 2022, giving the conference an inaugural soccer membership of 9. Kentucky and South Carolina were previously also affiliated with C-USA, while West Virginia was affiliated with the MAC. The SBC later announced it would add UCF as a men's soccer affiliate when that school joins the Big 12 Conference in 2023.

On June 6, the SBC presidents & chancellors approved adding two new women's sports, beach volleyball and swimming & diving, no later than the 2023–24 school year. They also announced that the conference would explore adding another women's sport, field hockey, at an undetermined future date. 

On January 18, 2023, the SBC officially announced that its beach volleyball league would launch that spring, with the four full members sponsoring the sport joined by Charleston, Mercer, UNC Wilmington, and Stephen F. Austin as affiliate members.

Member schools

Current members

Notes

Affiliate members

 The four beach volleyball associates (Charleston, Mercer, Stephen F. Austin, and UNCW) are listed as having joined in 2022, even though they were not announced as incoming affiliates until January 2023. The SBC's first beach volleyball season of 2023, which features the four schools, is part of the 2022–23 school year.

Future affiliate members

Former members

Notes

Former affiliate members

Notes

Membership timeline

Commissioners

 Vic Bubas (1976–1990)
 Jim Lessig (1990–1991)
 Craig Thompson (1991–1998)
 Wright Waters (1999–2012)
 Karl Benson (2012–2019)
 Keith Gill (2019–present)

In addition to the five Sun Belt commissioners, three future league leaders served on the Sun Belt staff prior to becoming conference commissioners, including Doug Elgin (Missouri Valley), John Iamarino (Northeast, Southern), and Tom Burnett (Southland).

On October 12, 2011, ESPN reported that Wright Waters would retire, effective July 1, 2012. On February 15, 2012, Karl Benson was hired as the new commissioner of the Sun Belt, after having been the commissioner of the Western Athletic Conference for 17 years. Waters would later move his departure date to March 15, allowing Benson to take over at that time.

Keith Gill was named the commissioner of the Sun Belt Conference on March 18, 2019. He is the first African American to lead any FBS conference.

Sports

As of the current 2022–23 school year, the Sun Belt Conference sponsors championship competition in nine men's and ten women's NCAA sanctioned sports. The most recent changes to sports sponsorship were the reinstatement of men's soccer, which had been dropped after the 2020–21 school year, and the addition of beach volleyball, both in 2022–23.

When Marshall was formally introduced as an incoming Sun Belt member, SBC commissioner Keith Gill also announced that the conference would reinstate men's soccer once all new members joined. Men's soccer resumed play in 2022–23 with six full members joined by three associates. Beach volleyball started play with eight members, evenly divided between full members and associates.

The conference also announced it would start sponsoring women's swimming and diving no later than the 2023-24 school year, as well as explore the possibility of sponsoring field hockey.

Men's sponsored sports by school
Member-by-member sponsorship of the nine men's SBC sports for the 2022–23 academic year.

Men's varsity sports not sponsored by the Sun Belt

Women's sponsored sports by school
Member-by-member sponsorship of the 10 women's SBC sports for the 2022–23 academic year.

Women's varsity sports not sponsored by the Sun Belt

Championships

"RS" is regular season, "T" is tournament. Championships from the previous academic year are flagged with the calendar year in which the most recent season or tournament ended.

Current Sun Belt champions

Fall 2022

Winter 2021–22

Spring 2022

NCAA champions
The only school to have won a national title while an SBC member is Old Dominion, which won one title in women's basketball and five in the non-SBC sport of field hockey during its first conference tenure from 1982 to 1991. Six other current members have won NCAA Division I team championships prior to joining the conference. Coastal Carolina won its only D-I national title on the day before it officially joined the SBC, while representing the Big South Conference.

See also:
List of NCAA schools with the most NCAA Division I championships,
List of NCAA schools with the most Division I national championships, and
NCAA Division I FBS Conferences

Football
For more information see Sun Belt Conference football. For the current season, see 2023 Sun Belt Conference football season.

The Sun Belt first began sponsoring football in 2001. It originally consisted of seven football playing schools, three of which are still members of the conference.  Up until 2009, the conference only had a contract with one bowl, the New Orleans Bowl.  Following the Sun Belt's improved football success and geographical membership changes, other bowls began to sign contracts with the Sun Belt Conference. , the conference has seven bowl game tie-ins (Cure, Boca Raton, LendingTree, New Orleans, Myrtle Beach, Frisco, and Camellia)

Throughout the years, the conference has experienced flux in membership changes, similar to many other FBS conferences.  The conference announced that beginning in 2018, the conference (10 teams after the departure of Idaho and New Mexico State) would be divided into two divisions for football: East: Appalachian State, Coastal Carolina, Georgia Southern, Georgia State, and Troy; West: Arkansas State, Louisiana, Louisiana–Monroe, South Alabama, and Texas State. The divisional alignments changed again with the 2022 expansion, with the new dividing line being the Alabama–Georgia border. The winner of each division will meet in the Sun Belt Championship game.

Sun Belt champions
Since the 2018 NCAA Division I FBS season, the Sun Belt Conference has held a football championship game.

Notes
  Louisiana–Lafayette vacated 2013 shared Sun Belt Conference co-championship due to major NCAA violations.
 The 2020 championship game was canceled due to COVID-19 issues; the divisional champions were declared league co-champions.

Bowl games
As of the 2022–23 NCAA football bowl games, the Sun Belt Conference has tie-ins with the following bowl games:

Football rivalries
Football rivalries involving Sun Belt teams include:

Basketball

Men's basketball 
For the current season, see 2022–23 Sun Belt Conference men's basketball season.

This list goes through the 2021–22 season.

Championships 

Since the 2018–19 season, the Sun Belt Conference Men's and women's basketball tournaments, held in early March, have involved only 10 of the conference's 12 teams, and have been bracketed in a semi-stepladder format. The bottom four seeds play in the first round; the 5 and 6 seeds receive byes to the second round, the 3 and 4 seeds to the quarterfinals, and the top two seeds to the semifinals. The semifinals and finals are held in New Orleans; the 2019 men's and women's events were at Lakefront Arena, and from 2020 will be at Smoothie King Center. Winners of the tournaments earn automatic bids to their respective NCAA Division I basketball tournament.

Baseball

The Sun Belt Conference has sponsored an annual baseball tournament to determine the conference winner since 1978. South Alabama has won the most championships, at 13.
 Teams in bold represent current conference members.

Facilities

Notes

Academics
Four of the Sun Belt's member schools, Georgia State, Louisiana, Old Dominion and Southern Miss are doctorate-granting universities with "very high research activity," the highest classification given by the Carnegie Foundation for the Advancement of Teaching.

Appalachian State is also currently ranked as one of the Top 10 regional schools in the South by the U.S. News & World Report.

See also
List of American collegiate athletic stadiums and arenas

Notes

References

External links
 

 
Organizations based in New Orleans
Sports organizations established in 1976
Sports in the Southern United States
College sports in Alabama
College sports in Arkansas
College sports in Georgia (U.S. state)
College sports in Louisiana
College sports in Mississippi
College sports in North Carolina
College sports in South Carolina
College sports in Texas
College sports in Virginia
College sports in West Virginia